The State Library of North Carolina is an institution which serves North Carolina libraries, state government employees, genealogists, and the citizens of North Carolina. The library is the main depository for North Carolina state publications and serves the needs of North Carolina government agencies and state government employees by providing access to information resources that are vital to public decision-making and economic development.

The State Library of North Carolina is a division of the North Carolina Department of Natural and Cultural Resources, an agency that promotes and protects North Carolina’s arts, history, and culture.

The library has two locations, both in the state capital, Raleigh.  The main building is located on East Jones Street next to the North Carolina State Legislative Building and near the North Carolina Museum of History and the North Carolina Museum of Natural Sciences. The Library for the Blind and Physically Handicapped is located on Capital Boulevard.

History

The origins of the State Library date from 1812 when the North Carolina General Assembly required the Secretary of State to collect, catalog, and safeguard books and documents for use by the state legislature and government officials. The library's primary responsibility during the nineteenth century was to serve the state legislature.

Although the State Library was patronized primarily by state officials, the public was allowed to use the reference collection on library premises beginning in 1845. Open circulation was permitted for a period during the 1870s until the mid 1880s. Until the last decade of the century, the State Library served as the state's only tax-supported library.

In response to a growing demand for more systematic support of the public library movement, the General Assembly of 1909 established the North Carolina Library Commission. Formed for the primary purpose of promoting the development of free public libraries on the local level, the commission's responsibilities included the following: assisting in the establishment of new libraries, including public school libraries; supplementing local collections; distributing library literature; and providing advice to trustees and libraries on library services. 

In 1918 the State Library was run by the first woman head of a state department in North Carolina, Carrie Lougee Broughton.

In 1955 the legislature combined the State Library and the North Carolina Library Commission into one agency called the State Library. The combined programs of these two agencies served as the foundation of future developments. The State Library's responsibilities included maintaining a general collection of books, periodicals, newspapers, maps, films, audio-visual and other materials. These materials were available for use on the premises by citizens and state employees and for circulation to public libraries, state agencies, and their employees under policies established by the state librarian and approved by the Board of Trustees. Other responsibilities involved providing sets of laws and journals for the General Assembly and offering advice and assistance to libraries throughout the state and to other state agencies with special reference collections.

At the request of the North Carolina Commission for the Blind in 1958, the State Library accepted responsibility for providing library services to the blind. In subsequent years the State Library extended additional services to those unable to hold or read ordinary printed materials because of physical or visual impairments.

In the Executive Organization Act of 1973, the State Library was transferred to the Department of Cultural Resources, now the Department of Natural and Cultural Resources, which absorbed the statutory functions of the State Library.

In 1987 the legislature established a depository system for the distribution of state publications to designated libraries throughout the state. Under terms of the law, the Division of State Library was given responsibility for administering an orderly system to provide public access to the valuable current and historical publications of state government—including documents in paper, film, tape, disk, or any other format. In order to facilitate a distribution system, the legislation authorized the establishment of a State Publications Clearinghouse within the State Library.

The State Library Commission was restructured in 1991 and was given an advisory role to the secretary of Natural and Cultural Resources in the following major areas: recruitment and appointment of the state librarian and State Library operations and programs, including information services for the cultural, educational, and economic well-being of the state. The commission was also charged with working for the financial support of local public library and statewide services, including interlibrary programs.

Services
The State Library of North Carolina provides the following services to its patrons:

North Carolina Digital Collections 
An online portal for over 90,000 historic and recent photographs, state government publications, manuscripts, and other resources on topics related to North Carolina. The Collections are free, full-text searchable, and bring together content from the State Archives of North Carolina and the State Library of North Carolina. The portal contains 30+ distinct collections, including State Publications, Family Records, Urban Development in North Carolina, and NC MOSAIC.

Digitization
The State Library's Government and Heritage Library heads an ongoing large-scale digitization project for state government publications in its collection, providing online access to historical state agency publications. These collections can be explored through the North Carolina State Government Publications Collection website. The Government and Heritage Library has also digitized materials from its genealogical collections and general collections. All digitized materials, including state publications and non-state publications, can be found online in the North Carolina Digital Collections.

Web and Social Media Archiving
The State Library's Government and Heritage Library, together with the State Archives of North Carolina, collects and archives the websites and social media accounts of state agencies.

Center for the Book
The North Carolina Center for the Book develops and coordinates a wide range of programs hosted locally by public libraries and their community partners. It serves as an advocate, promoting the vital role of books, reading, literacy, and libraries in North Carolina. This is a state affiliate of the Center for the Book at the Library of Congress.

Interlibrary Loan
The Government and Heritage Library offers interlibrary loan services to State Employees who work in Raleigh. State Employees who work outside of Raleigh can take advantage of Interlibrary Loan Services through their local public libraries.

LSTA Grants
The State Library is North Carolina's central point of dissemination for Library Services and Technology Act Grants. In 2006–2007, the State Library gave away $4.4 million in grants to eligible North Carolina academic, public, special, school, and state agency libraries.

NC LIVE
The public libraries, community colleges, the state's university system, and members of the North Carolina Association of Independent Colleges and Universities are provided online access to NC LIVE, an extensive and diverse collection of premium electronic resources.  The State Library, a member of NC LIVE, supports the training operations of the program.

NCpedia
Maintained by the Government and Heritage Library, and hosted by NC LIVE, this resource is designed to give an overview of the people, the government, the history, and the resources of North Carolina. The encyclopedia is organized into eight broad information categories: Counties and Communities, Education, Geography, Health and Society, History, People, State Government, and State Symbols.

North Carolina State Publications Clearinghouse
The North Carolina State Publications Clearinghouse is responsible for collecting, classifying, cataloging and distributing the publications of state government agencies to selected North Carolina Depository Libraries throughout the state. Currently, there are 22 Depository Libraries throughout North Carolina that receive publications through the North Carolina State Publications Clearinghouse. The Clearinghouse also collects and preserves digital state publications that are made accessible to the public through the digital State Publications Collection.

Public Librarian Certification
In North Carolina, the standards for the certification of public librarians are set by the North Carolina Public Library Certification Commission. The Commission meets quarterly to consider applications from librarians who wish to gain their North Carolina certification as public librarians.

References
Reference services are provided at both of the State Library's locations, on E. Jones Street and Capital Boulevard in Raleigh.

Youth Services
The Library Development Section offers resources, programs, workshops and training opportunities related to library services for youth.

Government and Heritage Library collections

Genealogy
The Government and Heritage Library boasts one of the largest and most comprehensive collections of North Carolina genealogical resources in the state. The Genealogy Collection includes books (family histories, published abstracts, county, state and federal records), periodicals, census indexes, and microfilms related to North Carolina as well as states from which and to which North Carolinians migrated. Nearly all the Genealogy materials are shelved in open stacks. The Genealogy Reading Room is located on the Mezzanine floor of the State Library.

General Collection
A diverse general collection containing many resources concerning North Carolina's rich history, biographies, fiction, travel books, children's books related to North Carolina, and other topics of interest to North Carolinians. All items in the General Collection are shelved in closed stacks which are only accessible to State Library staff. A patron can view books from the General Collection by requesting them from the State Library's Information (Reference) Desk.

Government Documents
The State Library is the official, complete, and permanent depository for State publications. As such, they have one of the largest and most comprehensive collections of North Carolina documents in the state. The State Library is also a member of the Federal Depository Library Program. As such, they have an impressive collection of Federal government publications as well. Except for the documents in the reference collection, all government documents are shelved in closed stacks which are only accessible to State Library staff. A patron can view documents by requesting them from the State Library's Information Desk.

North Carolina Newspapers
An impressive collection of North Carolina newspapers on microfilm containing over 3 million newspaper pages. The collection contains selected newspapers from just about every one of the 100 counties in North Carolina; certain titles date as far back as 1751. Current newspapers are shelved in the reference reading room. All newspapers on microfilm are shelved in closed stacks which are only accessible to State Library staff. A patron can view microfilmed newspapers by requesting them from the State Library's Information Desk.

Rare Books
A small and specialized selection of rare books which cover topics related to North Carolina. Qualities of the rare books include age, limited printings, signatures, and/or custom illustrations. All rare books are shelved in closed stacks which are only accessible to State Library staff. A patron can view rare materials by requesting them from the State Library's Information Desk.

References
The reference collection contains: North Carolina resources, current periodicals and newspapers, business information, North Carolina telephone directories, frequently requested state and federal government publications, statistical materials, directories, indices, and maps.

DVDs and Videos
A collection of videocassettes and DVDs designed to support the departments and programs of the state government. The collection is particularly strong in the areas of business, human resource development, and safety training. The videos and DVDs can be borrowed by state agencies and/or state employees for 10 days. All videos and DVDs are shelved in closed stacks which are only accessible to State Library staff. A patron can request videos and DVDs at the State Library's Information Desk.

Library for the Blind and Physically Handicapped collection

The Library for the Blind and Physically Handicapped offers the same book and magazine titles found in a typical public library. Materials are in large print, braille, or audio formats. The audio materials are either cassette tapes or record discs. Patrons may read one or more formats of their choice. The cassette tape and records are recorded at slower speeds than commercially available tapes and records. Thus, the library also loans specially designed cassette players and record players to patrons who request tape or record service. All of these resources are housed in the Library for the Blind and Physically Handicapped at 1841 Capital Boulevard in Raleigh.

Library structure
The State Library is made up of three main sections (Administration Section, Library Development Section, and the Library Services Section) and the North Carolina State Library Commission.

Administration Section
The Administration Section is made up of the State Librarian, two Assistant State Librarians, and Budget/Administrative personnel.

Library Commission
The State Library Commission is a 15-member group of citizens and professional librarians, which provides assistance, advice, and counsel to all libraries and all persons interested in the best means of establishing and administering libraries. The Commission advises the Secretary of Cultural Resources and the State Librarian on priorities and policy issues.

Library Development Section
The Library Development Section offers a comprehensive program of services including serving as a liaison to libraries in specific counties, providing assistance with grant programs, continuing education events, publications, special programs, surveys, and other State Library activities.

Library Services Section
The Library Services Section is responsible for providing library and information resources for North Carolinians to promote knowledge, education, and business. This function is carried out through the Government and Heritage Library (including the Digital Information Management Program) and the Library for the Blind and Physically Handicapped.

References

External links

Department of Natural and Cultural Resources
NCpedia
2003–2004 North Carolina Manual

1812 establishments in North Carolina
Buildings and structures in Raleigh, North Carolina
Education in Raleigh, North Carolina
Government agencies established in 1812
Library
Libraries in North Carolina
North Carolina